Spanker can refer to:

 One who administers a spanking 
 Spanker (horse), a famous 18th-century thoroughbred race horse 
 Spanker, Ohio, an unincorporated community
 SS-17 Spanker, the NATO reporting name for the MR-UR-100 Sotka intercontinental ballistic missile
 Spanker (sail), a sail.